Joel Coleman (born 26 September 1995) is an English professional footballer who plays as a goalkeeper for Ipswich Town.

Career

Oldham Athletic
Coleman was born in Bolton, Greater Manchester. An Oldham Athletic youth graduate, he signed a two-year scholarship with the club in 2012. He signed his first professional contract with the club on 18 June 2014, penning a two-year contract.

Coleman made his first-team debut on 17 March 2015, coming on as a 57th-minute substitute for Jake Kean in a 3–1 League One home loss against Milton Keynes Dons.

Huddersfield Town
Coleman signed for Championship club Huddersfield Town on 7 June 2016 on a three-year contract for an undisclosed fee. He made his debut on 26 December 2016, playing the entirety of a 2–1 win at home to Nottingham Forest.

He replaced the suspended Danny Ward for the first leg of the Championship play-off semi-final against Sheffield Wednesday, keeping a clean sheet in the process. Following Huddersfield Town's promotion to the Premier League, Coleman signed a new two-year contract with the club on 30 July 2017.

Shrewsbury Town (loan)
Coleman joined League One club Shrewsbury Town on 27 July 2018 on loan for the 2018–19 season, after signing a new two-year contract at Huddersfield with the option of a further year.

Fleetwood Town
On 20 August 2020, Coleman joined League One club Fleetwood Town on a two-year deal.

On 6 August 2021, Coleman left Fleetwood Town by mutual consent.

Rochdale
On 6 August 2021, Coleman signed a one-year contract with Rochdale. He was released by the club in May 2022.

Ipswich Town
On 4 November 2022, Coleman signed a short-term deal for Ipswich Town following the injury to third-choice goalkeeper Nick Hayes.

Career statistics

Honours
Huddersfield Town
EFL Championship play-offs: 2017

References

External links
Profile at the Huddersfield Town A.F.C. website

1995 births
Living people
Footballers from Bolton
English footballers
Association football goalkeepers
Oldham Athletic A.F.C. players
Huddersfield Town A.F.C. players
Shrewsbury Town F.C. players
Fleetwood Town F.C. players
Rochdale A.F.C. players
Ipswich Town F.C. players
English Football League players
Premier League players